Nilpena Station is a pastoral lease that operates as a sheep station in South Australia.

History 
Thomas Elder and Robert Barr Smith acquired Nilpena in 1859.

William James Browne owned the property in 1879 when he had the drover Giles take 12,000 sheep from Nilpena and overland them all the way to his new properties Newcastle Waters and Delamere Stations. Only 8000 sheep survived the journey, but it was still regarded as one of the most remarkable droving feats in Australian history. Browne appointed Roderick John Matheson to manage the property, along with Arkaba Station. Matheson and John Lewis later bought Nilpena, with Matheson later buying out Lewis.

In 1925, the Old Nilpena Station was placed on the market for auction. At this time it occupied  and was stocked with over 3000 merino sheep. It failed to reach the reserve price of £11,750.

He was running about 15,000 sheep across the two properties.

By 1944 the property was carrying 7000 sheep.

In 1950, the station was run by the Nilpena Pastoral Company, whose managing director was a Mr Toll. The  property had over  completely under water. Mr Toll estimated at the time that the property would have sufficient feed guaranteed for the next two years.

Some time prior to the 1980s, the Fargher family acquired the property. Ross Fargher discovered a pristine Ediacaran fossil site in the 1980s that later became the focus of groundbreaking research, and an application being made for World Heritage listing to help protect the site.

In 2009, the fossils and the property featured on the David Attenborough program First Life.

See also
List of ranches and stations

References

Pastoral leases in South Australia
Stations (Australian agriculture)
Flinders Ranges
Far North (South Australia)